Alusine Koroma (born 9 June 2000) is a Sierra Leonean footballer who plays for Spanish club Linense and the Sierra Leone national team.

Club career 
In 2019 Koroma was part of the East End Lions team that won the Sierra Leone National Premier League. In July 2019 he went on trial with Spanish club Real Balompédica Linense, the club where his twin brother Alhassan had already signed. He went on to sign for the club and made his debut for the reserve team in February 2021 against CD Alcalá Del Valle. In June 2021 both Koroma brothers signed a three-year contract extension with Linense.

International career 
Koroma made his senior international debut on 17 March 2018 in a friendly against Iran.

References

External links
National Football Teams profile
Soccerway profile

1997 births
Living people
People from Tonkolili District
Sierra Leonean footballers
Association football midfielders
East End Lions F.C. players
Segunda División B players
Real Balompédica Linense footballers
Sierra Leone international footballers
Sierra Leonean expatriate footballers
Sierra Leonean expatriates in Spain
Expatriate footballers in Spain